(born 30 April 1970) is a former Japanese rugby union player. He played as fullback and wing.

Career
Matsuda started playing rugby at Soga High School and after entering Kanto Gakuin University, he switched from number 8 to fullback. After graduating from university, he joined Toshiba Fuchu. From 1996, he became a central player in the team, including during the achievement of the three consecutive Japanese championship titles under the "P to GO" tactics of the then-coach Shogo Mukai.
Even though he was called up in the 1991 Rugby World Cup roster, he had no opportunity to participate as he was at the time enrolled in university. He earned his first cap in 1992 against Hong Kong. Later, he became a member of Japanese national team as fullback, participating at the 1995, 1999 and 2003 World Cups, for three consecutive competitions.

Matsuda had also experiences with the Japan sevens team, with which he played the 1993 Rugby World Cup Sevens.

In 2007, he was elected in the Asia Squad to play against the Barbarians in the Lipovitan D Challenge.

Even after the age of 40, Matsuda started in a Top League official match. He has the Top League's longest player record and he is the try record holder.

As of 18 March 2013, Matsuda announced his retirement. "I loved rugby and i was able to enjoy the tight, so i continued it for a long time".

Notes

External links
Tsutomu Matsuda international stats

1970 births
Living people
Rugby union fullbacks
Rugby union wings
Japanese rugby union players
Japan international rugby union players
Japan international rugby sevens players
Asian Games medalists in rugby union
Rugby union players at the 1998 Asian Games
Asian Games silver medalists for Japan
Medalists at the 1998 Asian Games